Matthew Rorison Caws (born August 5, 1967) is an American singer, songwriter and guitarist. He is best known as the lead vocalist and guitarist of the alternative rock band Nada Surf. Caws is also a member of the indie rock duo Minor Alps, alongside Juliana Hatfield.

Early life 

Caws was born in New York City, the son of Peter James Caws and Mary Ann Caws. Caws' mother was born and raised in Wilmington, North Carolina. His father was born in Southall, Middlesex.  Matthew Caws' parents, both university professors, took sabbaticals in France—in Paris, and in the Vaucluse in Provence—which helped Matthew develop early skills in French. Caws' mother, a Distinguished Professor of Comparative Literature, English, and French at the Graduate Center at CUNY, lives in New York City. Caws' father, University Professor of Philosophy at George Washington University, lived in Washington, D.C. Caws' parents divorced in 1987. In 2007, his mother married Dr. Boyce Bennett. His father married Nancy Breslin, M.D., M.F.A., a psychiatrist turned fine art photographer. Caws' great-grandmother was painter Margaret Walthour Lippitt.

Caws has a half sister from his father's second marriage named Elisabeth Breslin Caws. Caws has an older sister, Hilary Caws-Elwitt. She is married to humorist and playwright Jonathan Caws-Elwitt, who also writes erotica under the pen name Jeremy Edwards. They formed the band The Silly Pillows together and live in Northampton, Massachusetts.

Musical projects

When the family returned to New York City, his parents sent him to the Lycée Français de New York. There he joined The Cost of Living in 1982 or 1983, a band formed by a teacher, Patrick Thouron, and a few students, including Daniel Lorca, Stéphane Dehais, and Fabrice Griffoulière-Frère, initiating a long friendship and a promising collaboration. Caws told a Boston audience in March 2018 that he and Lorca wanted to form a band sooner than their parents allowed at age 15.

The Cost of Living split up in 1990, after having released two records, played in venues such as CBGB, and having a video played on MTV, but Matthew and Daniel joined another band, Because Because Because, with two other musicians. This enterprise was short-lived and they soon split up, despite the recording of a demo, unreleased to this day, for the label Stickboy, which would later release Nada Surf's first single (7"), "The Plan/Telescope", in 1994.

Hilary, Matthew's elder sister, was a college radio DJ. She helped develop and influence her younger brother's musical tastes, lending him records from her impressive collection and cassette tapes of her show. Matthew joined the project initiated by Hilary and her partner, Jonathan, The Silly Pillows, for a few collaborations.

He also wrote and edited for Guitar World, interviewing, among others, Oasis and Mick Jones.

Minor Alps
In 2013, Caws and singer-songwriter Juliana Hatfield formed the new band Minor Alps. The duo's debut album, Get There, was released on October 29, 2013 on Barsuk Records.

Julie Gayet appears in the Minor Alps music video for their song "Waiting For You."

Personal life
In 2016 he married Emily Bidwell. The couple has stated they will split their time between Caws' residence in Cambridge, England, and New York.

In 2022, Caws and his son made a PSA called "Living with a Mild Essential Tremor".

References

External links
 Official website
 

American male bloggers
American bloggers
American male singer-songwriters
American rock guitarists
American male guitarists
American rock singers
American rock songwriters
Lycée Français de New York alumni
Singers from New York City
1967 births
Living people
American alternative rock musicians
American indie rock musicians
American expatriates in England
Guitarists from New York City
20th-century American guitarists
Nada Surf members
20th-century American male musicians
Singer-songwriters from New York (state)